Hyposmocoma catapyrrha is a species of moth of the family Cosmopterigidae. It was first described by Edward Meyrick in 1935. It is endemic to the Hawaiian island of Maui. The type locality is Olinda.

The larvae feed on Rubus hawaiiensis.

External links

catapyrrha
Endemic moths of Hawaii
Moths described in 1935